Stefan Florescu (1926/1927 – October 29, 2010) was an American paralympic swimmer and table tennis player. He participated at the 1964 Summer Paralympics.

Biography 
Florescu was born in Davenport, Iowa. He attended at St. Ambrose University, later graduating in 1951. Florescu was a part of a swimming incident in 1952, causing him to be quadriplegic. He participated at the National Wheelchair Games in New York, in which Florescu won a free trip to participate at the Paralympic Games along with his teammates, in 1964.

Florescu participated at the 1964 Summer Paralympics, with participating in the swimming competition at the Paralympic Games. He was awarded the bronze medal in the 25m freestyle prone complete class 1 event. Florescu scored 1:02:20. He also participated in the 25m freestyle supine complete class 1 event, being awarded the bronze medal. Florescu scored 0:57:20. He also participated in the 25m breaststroke complete class 1 event, being awarded the silver medal. Florescu scored 1:36:80. He participated in the table tennis competition at the Paralympic Games. Florescu participated in the Singles A1 event, being awarded the gold medal.

Florescu died in October 2010, at the age of 83.

References

External links 
Paralympic Games profile

1920s births
2010 deaths
Year of birth missing (living people)
Sportspeople from Davenport, Iowa
People with tetraplegia
Swimmers at the 1964 Summer Paralympics
Table tennis players at the 1964 Summer Paralympics
American male swimmers
American male breaststroke swimmers
American male freestyle swimmers
American male table tennis players
Medalists at the 1964 Summer Paralympics
Paralympic medalists in swimming
Paralympic medalists in table tennis
Paralympic gold medalists for the United States
Paralympic swimmers of the United States
Paralympic table tennis players of the United States
St. Ambrose University alumni
Paralympic bronze medalists for the United States
Paralympic silver medalists for the United States